Anthony Schwartz (born September 5, 2000) is an American football wide receiver for the Cleveland Browns of the National Football League (NFL). He played college football at Auburn. A world-class sprinter during his high school years, Schwartz held the former world under-18 best in the 100 meters between 2017 and 2022.

Amateur career
As a high school track athlete, Schwartz set a new World Youth Best of 10.15 seconds over 100 meters on March 31, 2017.

A native of Pembroke Pines, Florida, Schwartz also played football in high school, and was ranked the No. 22 prospect in the state by Rivals.com. On February 7, 2018, Schwartz signed a national letter of intent to play football and run track for the Auburn Tigers. He played for Auburn during the 2018 season, including their appearance in the 2018 Music City Bowl, where he scored a second-quarter touchdown.

Track statistics

Personal bests

International competitions

National titles
USA Junior Championships
100 meters: 2018

Professional career

On April 30, 2021, Schwartz was selected by the Cleveland Browns in the third round with the 91st overall pick in the 2021 NFL Draft. On July 23, Schwartz signed his four-year rookie contract with Cleveland, worth $4.86 million. In a game against the Green Bay Packers on December 25, 2021, Schwartz collected his first NFL touchdown on a 5-yard completion from Baker Mayfield. He appeared in 14 games and started two as a rookie. He finished with ten receptions for 135 receiving yards and one touchdown.

On December 7, 2022, Schwartz was placed on injured reserve with a concussion. He appeared in 11 games and started one in the 2022 season.

NFL career statistics

Regular season

References

External links

Cleveland Browns bio
Auburn Tigers track bio
Auburn Tigers football bio

2000 births
Living people
People from Plantation, Florida
Sportspeople from Broward County, Florida
American male sprinters
Track and field athletes from Florida
African-American male track and field athletes
Auburn Tigers men's track and field athletes
Auburn Tigers football players
American football wide receivers
Cleveland Browns players
Players of American football from Florida
21st-century African-American sportspeople
American Heritage School (Florida) alumni